The 1928 Tulane Green Wave football team represented Tulane University as a member of the Southern Conference (SoCon) during the 1928 college football season. Led by second-year head coach Bernie Bierman, the Green Wave played their home games at Tulane Stadium in New Orleans. Tulane finished the season with an overall record of 6–3–1 and a mark of 3–3–1 in conference play.

Schedule

References

Tulane
Tulane Green Wave football seasons
Tulane Green Wave football